Inocencia Solis was a Filipino sprinter who competed at the 1958 and 1962 Asian Games.

Career
A native of New Lucena in Iloilo, Solis was born on December 28, 1932, to Victorino Solis and Leonarda Silomenio who are both farmers. She started competing in athletic competitions while she was studying at New Lucena Elementary School. She continued to compete while attending Santa Barbara National High School. In 1950, she won three gold medals at the National Inter-Scholastic Athletic Association by setting new national records in the 100-meter and 200-meter runs and in long jump. She held this record for years; 12 years (for the 100-meter run), 15 years (200-meter), and 7 years (long jump).

The Cebu Institute of Technology gave her full scholarship for her feat in athletics. She obtained a bachelor's degree in elementary education from the educational institution and went on to become a school teacher, while simultaneously worked as a coach based in Cebu.

Solis competed for the Philippines at the 1958 Asian Games in Tokyo where she won the gold medal in the women's 100 meters event with a time record of 12 minutes and 5 seconds. The Philippine Sportswriters Association recognized her as the Athlete of the Year in 1958. She moved to Caloocan sometime in the 1960s, after the city government recruited her. She also competed in the 1962 Asian Games where she won another gold medal; in the 4 x 100 meters event with Mona Solaiman, Aida Molinos and Francisca Sanopal.

Death
Solis died on November 4, 2001, while at the Iloilo Mission Hospital due to complications from diabetes.

References

Philippine Sports Hall of Fame inductees
1932 births
2001 deaths
Filipino female sprinters
Athletes (track and field) at the 1958 Asian Games
Medalists at the 1958 Asian Games
Asian Games medalists in athletics (track and field)
Asian Games gold medalists for the Philippines